West Nanticoke is a census-designated place (CDP) in Plymouth Township, Luzerne County, Pennsylvania, United States, across the Susquehanna River from the city of Nanticoke. The population of the CDP was 749 at the 2010 census.

Geography
It is across the river from the city of Nanticoke, to which it is connected by the Lower Broadway Street Bridge. Pennsylvania Route 29 joins U.S. Route 11 in the center of West Nanticoke. To the north, Route 29 leads to Silkworth and Pikes Creek. Just east of West Nanticoke, Route 29 becomes the South Cross Valley Expressway, crossing the Susquehanna River and leading to Interstate 81 south of Wilkes-Barre. U.S. Route 11 heads northeast to Plymouth and Kingston and southwest to Shickshinny and Berwick.

Gallery

References

Census-designated places in Luzerne County, Pennsylvania
Census-designated places in Pennsylvania